These 157 species belong to Macrosiphoniella, a genus of aphids in the family Aphididae.

Macrosiphoniella species

 Macrosiphoniella abrotani (Walker, F., 1852) c g
 Macrosiphoniella absinthii (Linnaeus, 1758) c g
 Macrosiphoniella achlys Zhang, Guangxue, Xiaolin Chen, Tiesen Zhong & Jing c g
 Macrosiphoniella aetnensis Barbagallo, 1968 c g
 Macrosiphoniella ajaniae Kadyrbekov, 1999 c g
 Macrosiphoniella aktaschica  c g
 Macrosiphoniella aktashica (Nevsky, 1928) c g
 Macrosiphoniella alatavica (Nevsky, 1928) c g
 Macrosiphoniella albiartemisiae Zhang, Guangxue, Xiaolin Chen, Tiesen Zhong & Jing c g
 Macrosiphoniella albicola  c g
 Macrosiphoniella altaica  c g
 Macrosiphoniella annulata  c g
 Macrosiphoniella antennata  c g
 Macrosiphoniella arctica Pashtshenko, 1999 c g
 Macrosiphoniella arenariae Bozhko, 1954 c g
 Macrosiphoniella artemisiae (Boyer de Fonscolombe, 1841) c g
 Macrosiphoniella asteris (Walker, F., 1849) c g
 Macrosiphoniella atra (Ferrari, 1872) c g
 Macrosiphoniella atrata  c g
 Macrosiphoniella austriacae Bozhko, 1961 c g
 Macrosiphoniella borealis Pashtshenko, 1998 c g
 Macrosiphoniella bozhkoae Remaudière, G., 1997 c g
 Macrosiphoniella brevisiphona Zhang, Guangxue, 1981 c g
 Macrosiphoniella capillaricola Holman, Seungwhan Lee & Jan Havelka, 2006 c g
 Macrosiphoniella caucasica  c g
 Macrosiphoniella cayratiae  c g
 Macrosiphoniella cegmidi Szelegiewicz, 1963 c g
 Macrosiphoniella chaetosiphon Takahashi, R. & Moritsu, 1963 c g
 Macrosiphoniella chamaemelifoliae Remaudière, G. & Leclant, 1972 c g
 Macrosiphoniella cinerescens Hille Ris Lambers, 1966 c g
 Macrosiphoniella confusa Holman, Seungwhan Lee & Jan Havelka, 2006 c g
 Macrosiphoniella crassipes  c g
 Macrosiphoniella crepidis Holman & Szelegiewicz, 1974 c g
 Macrosiphoniella cymbariae Bozhko, 1976 c g
 Macrosiphoniella davazhamci Holman & Szelegiewicz, 1974 c g
 Macrosiphoniella dimidiata Börner, 1942 c g
 Macrosiphoniella dracunculi  c g
 Macrosiphoniella dubia (Ferrari, 1872) c g
 Macrosiphoniella elegans Pashtshenko, 1999 c g
 Macrosiphoniella elenae Pashtshenko, 1999 c g
 Macrosiphoniella erigeronis Nevsky, 1928 c g
 Macrosiphoniella erythraea Zhang, Guangxue & Qiao, 1999 c g
 Macrosiphoniella femorata Bozhko, 1976 c g
 Macrosiphoniella flaviviridis Zhang, Guangxue, 1981 c g
 Macrosiphoniella formosartemisia Takahashi, 1921 g
 Macrosiphoniella formosartemisiae Takahashi, R., 1921 c g
 Macrosiphoniella frigidae  c g
 Macrosiphoniella frigidicola Gillette & M.A. Palmer, 1928 c g
 Macrosiphoniella frigidivora Holman & Szelegiewicz, 1974 c g
 Macrosiphoniella galatellae Bozhko, 1953 c g
 Macrosiphoniella gaoloushana Zhang, Guangxue, Xiaolin Chen, Tiesen Zhong & Jing c g
 Macrosiphoniella glabra (Gillette & Palmer, 1928) c g b
 Macrosiphoniella gmelinicola Szelegiewicz, 1980 c g
 Macrosiphoniella grandicauda Takahashi, R. & Moritsu, 1963 c g
 Macrosiphoniella helichrysi Remaudière, 1952 c g
 Macrosiphoniella hikosanensis  c g
 Macrosiphoniella hillerislambersi Ossiannilsson, 1954 c g
 Macrosiphoniella himalayana  c g
 Macrosiphoniella hofuchui Zhang, Guangxue, Xiaolin Chen, Tiesen Zhong & Jing c g
 Macrosiphoniella hokkaidensis Miyazaki, 1971 c g
 Macrosiphoniella huaidensis Zhang, Guangxue, 1980 c g
 Macrosiphoniella huochengensis Zhang, Guangxue, Xiaolin Chen, Tiesen Zhong & Jing c g
 Macrosiphoniella insignata Kadyrbekov, 1999 c g
 Macrosiphoniella iranica Nieto Nafría & Pérez Hidalgo, 2013 c g
 Macrosiphoniella ixeridis Holman, Seungwhan Lee & Jan Havelka, 2006 c g
 Macrosiphoniella janckei Börner, 1939 c g
 Macrosiphoniella jankei Borner, 1939 g
 Macrosiphoniella jaroslavi Stekolshchikov & Khruleva, 2015 c g
 Macrosiphoniella kalimpongensis Basu, R.C. & D.N. Raychaudhuri, 1976 c g
 Macrosiphoniella karatavica Kadyrbekov, 2015 c g
 Macrosiphoniella kareliniae Kadyrbekov, Renxin & Shao, 2002 c g
 Macrosiphoniella kaufmanni Börner, 1940 c g
 Macrosiphoniella kermanensis Mehrparvar & Rezwani, 2007 c g
 Macrosiphoniella kikungshana  c g
 Macrosiphoniella kirgisica  c g
 Macrosiphoniella kuwayamai  c g
 Macrosiphoniella lazoica Pashtshenko, 1999 c g
 Macrosiphoniella lena Pashtshenko, 1998 c g
 Macrosiphoniella leucanthemi (Ferrari, 1872) c g
 Macrosiphoniella lidiae  c g
 Macrosiphoniella lijiangensis Zhang, Guangxue, Tiesen Zhong & Wanyu Zhang, 1992 c g
 Macrosiphoniella linariae (Koch, C.L., 1855) c g
 Macrosiphoniella lithospermi Bozhko, 1959 c g
 Macrosiphoniella longirostrata Holman & Szelegiewicz, 1974 c g
 Macrosiphoniella lopatini  c g
 Macrosiphoniella ludovicianae (Oestlund, 1886) c g
 Macrosiphoniella maculata  c g
 Macrosiphoniella madeirensis Aguiar & Ilharco, 2005 c g
 Macrosiphoniella medvedevi (Bozhko, 1957) c g
 Macrosiphoniella miestingeri (Börner, 1950) c g
 Macrosiphoniella millefolii (De Geer, 1773) c g b
 Macrosiphoniella mutellinae Börner, 1950 c g
 Macrosiphoniella myohyangsani Szelegiewicz, 1980 c g
 Macrosiphoniella nigropilosa  c g
 Macrosiphoniella nitida Börner, 1950 c g
 Macrosiphoniella oblonga (Mordvilko, 1901) c g
 Macrosiphoniella olgae  c g
 Macrosiphoniella oronensis Szelegiewicz, 1980 c g
 Macrosiphoniella pallidipes Holman, Seungwhan Lee & Jan Havelka, 2006 c g
 Macrosiphoniella papillata Holman, 1962 c g
 Macrosiphoniella paradoxa  c g
 Macrosiphoniella paraoblonga Basu, R.C. & D.N. Raychaudhuri, 1976 c g
 Macrosiphoniella paucisetosa Robinson, 1987 c g
 Macrosiphoniella pennsylvanica (Pepper, 1950) c g
 Macrosiphoniella persequens (Walker, F., 1852) c g
 Macrosiphoniella piceaphis (Zhang, Guangxue, Xiaolin Chen, Tiesen Zhong & Jin c g
 Macrosiphoniella procerae Bozhko, 1953 c g
 Macrosiphoniella pseudoartemisiae Shinji, 1933 c g
 Macrosiphoniella pseudotanacetaria Holman, Seungwhan Lee & Jan Havelka, 2006 c g
 Macrosiphoniella ptarmicae Hille Ris Lambers, 1956 c g
 Macrosiphoniella pulvera (Walker, F., 1848) c g
 Macrosiphoniella quinifontana Zhang, Guangxue, Xiaolin Chen, Tiesen Zhong & Jing c g
 Macrosiphoniella remaudierei Barbagallo & Nieto Nafría, 2016 c g
 Macrosiphoniella riedeli Szelegiewicz, 1963 c g
 Macrosiphoniella sachalinensis Pashtshenko, 1998 c g
 Macrosiphoniella sanborni (Gillette, 1908) i c g b  (chrysanthemum aphid)
 Macrosiphoniella santolinifoliae Kadyrbekov, 1999 c g
 Macrosiphoniella saussureae  c g
 Macrosiphoniella scepariae Bozhko, 1959 c g
 Macrosiphoniella sejuncta (Walker, F., 1848) c g
 Macrosiphoniella seriphidii Kadyrbekov, 2000 c g
 Macrosiphoniella sibirica  c g
 Macrosiphoniella sieversianae Holman & Szelegiewicz, 1974 c g
 Macrosiphoniella sikhotealinensis Pashtshenko, 1998 c g
 Macrosiphoniella sikkimartemisiae Agarwala & D.N. Raychaudhuri, 1977 c g
 Macrosiphoniella silvestrii Roberti, 1954 c g
 Macrosiphoniella similioblonga Zhang, Guangxue, 1980 c g
 Macrosiphoniella sojaki Holman & Szelegiewicz, 1974 c g
 Macrosiphoniella soosi Szelegiewicz, 1966 c g
 Macrosiphoniella spinipes Basu, A.N., 1968 c g
 Macrosiphoniella staegeri Hille Ris Lambers, 1947 c g
 Macrosiphoniella subaequalis Börner, 1942 c g
 Macrosiphoniella subterranea (Koch, C.L., 1855) c g
 Macrosiphoniella sudhakaris Banerjee, H., A.K. Ghosh & D.N. Raychaudhuri, 1969 c g
 Macrosiphoniella szalaymarzsoi Szelegiewicz, 1978 c g
 Macrosiphoniella tadshikana  c g
 Macrosiphoniella taesongsanensis Szelegiewicz, 1980 c g
 Macrosiphoniella tanacetaria (Kaltenbach, 1843) c g b  (tansy aphid)
 Macrosiphoniella tapuskae (Hottes & Frison, 1931) c g
 Macrosiphoniella teriolana Hille Ris Lambers, 1931 c g
 Macrosiphoniella terraealbae Kadyrbekov, 2000 c g
 Macrosiphoniella tsizhongi Zhang, Guangxue, Xiaolin Chen, Tiesen Zhong & Jing c g
 Macrosiphoniella tuberculata (Nevsky, 1928) c g
 Macrosiphoniella tuberculatumartemisicola Bozhko, 1957 c g
 Macrosiphoniella turanica Narzikulov & Umarov, 1969 c g
 Macrosiphoniella umarovi  c g
 Macrosiphoniella usquertensis Hille Ris Lambers, 1935 c g
 Macrosiphoniella vallesiacae Jorg & Lampel, 1988 c g
 Macrosiphoniella victoriae Kadyrbekov, 1999 c g
 Macrosiphoniella xeranthemi Bozhko, 1959 c g
 Macrosiphoniella xinjiangica Kadyrbekov, Renxin & Shao, 2002 c g
 Macrosiphoniella yangi Takahashi, R., 1937 c g
 Macrosiphoniella yomenae (Shinji, 1922) c g
 Macrosiphoniella yomogicola (Matsumura, 1917) c g
 Macrosiphoniella yomogifoliae (Shinji, 1922) c g
 Macrosiphoniella zayuensis Zhang, Guangxue, 1981 c g
 Macrosiphoniella zeya Pashtshenko, 1998 c g

Data sources: i = ITIS, c = Catalogue of Life, g = GBIF, b = Bugguide.net

References

Macrosiphoniella